Marszowice may refer to the following places in Poland:
Marszowice, Lower Silesian Voivodeship (south-west Poland)
Marszowice, Kraków County in Lesser Poland Voivodeship (south Poland)
Marszowice, Wieliczka County in Lesser Poland Voivodeship (south Poland)